National Highway 753B (Also a rout of Ankleshwar-Burhanpur Highway), commonly referred to as NH 753B is a national highway in  India. It is a spur road of National Highway 53. NH-753B traverses the states of Maharashtra and Gujarat in India.

Route 
Shevali, Nizampur, Chhadvel, Nandurbar, Taloda, Akkalkuwa, Khapar, Sagbara, Dediapada, Netrang.

Junctions  

  Terminal near Shevali.
  Terminal near Netrang.

See also 

 List of National Highways in India
 List of National Highways in India by state

References

External links 

 NH 753 on OpenStreetMap

National highways in India
National Highways in Maharashtra
National Highways in Gujarat